Sardukupodaam Randi is a 2000 Indian Telugu-language comedy film produced by Burugupalli Sivaramakrishna on Sri Venkateswara Art Films banner and directed by S. V. Krishna Reddy. Starring Jagapati Babu, Soundarya  and music also composed by S. V. Krishna Reddy. The film is inspired from ANR's old Telugu film Pelli Naati Pramanalu 1958. The film recorded as Hit at box office.

Plot
The film begins with the marriage of Krishna & Radha, they both spend very happily their 7 years of married life. But after that Radha becomes busy with household responsibilities. Krishna becomes fed up with her behavior, so he is attracted to his Secretary Nisha. The rest of the story is about how Radha protects her husband.

Cast

Jagapati Babu as Krishna 
Soundarya as Radha Rani
Asha Saini as Nisha
Prakash Raj as Problem Paramkusam
M. S. Narayana as Singaraju Lingaraju
AVS as Marideswara Rao 
Brahmanandam as Anandam
Tanikella Bharani
L. B. Sriram
Subbaraya Sharma
Sivaji Raja
Surya
Mithai Chitti
Gautham Raju
Jenny
Y. Vijaya
Annapurna
Sri Lakshmi
Rajitha
Siva Parvathi
Parvathi
Ratna Kumari
Rajasri
Alphonsa as item number 
Master Teja

Soundtrack

Music composed by S. V. Krishna Reddy. Music released on ADITYA Music Company.

Awards
 Nandi Award for Best Male Comedian - M. S. Narayana

References

2000 films
2000s Telugu-language films
Indian romantic drama films
Films directed by S. V. Krishna Reddy
Films scored by S. V. Krishna Reddy
2000 romantic drama films